Virbia rogersi is a moth in the family Erebidae first described by Herbert Druce in 1885. It is found in Costa Rica.

References

rogersi
Moths described in 1885